Enderleinellidae is a family of parasitic lice in the order Psocodea. There are about 5 genera and more than 50 described species in Enderleinellidae.

Genera
These five genera belong to the family Enderleinellidae:
 Atopophthirus Kim, 1977
 Enderleinellus Fahrenholz, 1912
 Microphthirus Ferris, 1919
 Phthirunculus Kuhn & Ludwig, 1965
 Werneckia Ferris, 1951

References

Further reading

 

Troctomorpha
Lice
Insect families